The William & Mary Tribe men's soccer team represents the College of William & Mary in NCAA Division I college soccer. The team belongs to the Colonial Athletic Association and plays home games at Albert-Daly Field. As of the 2019 season, the Tribe are led by 16th-year head coach Chris Norris. The team has an all-time record 559–319–108 (.630) since its founding in 1967. The Tribe have made 15 appearances in the NCAA tournament with a combined record of 9–15–2.

Head coaches
Joe Agee (1967–68)   
Jim Carpenter (1969–70)
Al Albert (1971–2003)
Chris Norris (2004–present)

Record by year
References:

Notable alumni

 Wade Barrett (1994–1997)
 Ralph Bean (2000–2002)
 Adin Brown (1996–2000)
 Roger Bothe (2006–2009)
 Scott Budnick (1989–1993)
 Carlos Garcia (1999–2003)
 Paul Grafer (1993–1995)
 Andrew Hoxie (2005–2009)
 Steve Jolley (1993–1996)
 Rob Olson (1977–1980)
 Jon Stewart (1980–1983)
 Khary Stockton (1989–1992)

NCAA Tournament performances

References

External links
 

 
Soccer clubs in Virginia
Soccer clubs in Hampton Roads
1967 establishments in Virginia
Association football clubs established in 1967